The Preston Passion was a live performance televised by BBC One on 6 April 2012 from Preston, Lancashire, England, retelling the Gospel accounts of the Crucifixion of Jesus through a filter of local history. Organized by the Preston Guild, the performance utilized professional performers, local volunteers and audience members.

Background
The Preston Passion takes its name from the Passion of Christ, a term widely used to encapsulate the events of the capture, trial and death of Jesus of Nazareth as described in the Gospels and celebrated by Christians at Easter.  It follows a tradition of Passion plays that are performed in many parts of the world over Easter.

Performance
In the dramas, three aspects of the Biblical narratives are retold through three events from the history of Preston, with the story of Pontius Pilate being related to the events of the Preston Strike of 1842, the story of Mary, the mother of Jesus related to the experiences of a local soldier in the First World War, and that of Jesus  being to related the sacrifice of a local school-girl caring for her younger siblings.

Singer Jamelia sang in the finale, replacing Heather Small who had to withdraw because of illness. The hymns and songs were sung by a large choir made up from parishes in and around Preston and UCLAN Chamber Choir. The pieces included William Horsley's There is a Green Hill Far Away, Jerusalem, Surely He Hath Borne Our Griefs (from Handel's Messiah), When I Survey the Wondrous Cross, Were You There and You've Got the Love.

Awards
In November 2012 the Preston Passion won the award for "Best Live Event" at the Royal Television Society's North West Awards.

Programme credits

 Executive Producer - Aaqil Ahmed 
 Development Executive - Pat Connor
 Development Producer - Steve Rawling

Drama
 Mrs Melling - Samantha Bond
 Samuel Horrocks - Tom Ellis
 Amy Cummins - Christine Bottomley
 Bishop Crowther - Ronald Pickup
 Betty Cleasby - Pooky Quesne
 Simon - Paul Barber
 Bella's Mother - Julia Haworth
 Scott - Lucas Burridge
 Presenter - Fern Britton
 Performer - Jamelia
 Writers - Colin Heber-Percy and Lyall Watson 
 Director - Daniel Wilson 
 Producer - Sandra Maciver 
 Executive Producer  - Hilary Martin
 Bella - Aimie Leach

Live Event
 Live Event Director - Mark Murphy 
 Outside Broadcast Producer and Director - Pamela Hossick 
 Creative Producer - Mike Smith
 Production - Walk the Plank

References

See also
York Mystery Plays

Preston, Lancashire
Passion plays
Holy Week